Miguel Ángel Barcasnegras (30 December 1933 – 28 November 2021), known professionally as Meñique, was a Panamanian singer and songwriter.

Discography

Solo
 1972: Meñique
 1974: Soy Hijo de Chango
 1975: Meñique Presenta Tropical de Chicago
 1983: Meñique En Blanco y Negro
 2004: Meñique, Sonero Añejo: 55 Años Trayectoria Músical 
 2008: Meñique, Salsa y Bembe 
 2013: El Gran Meñique y Chamaco Rivera Presentan Iván Marrero y su Charanga
 2015: Bolerisimo

References

External links
Official website
Meñique on Facebook
 
 

1933 births
2021 deaths
People from Panama City
20th-century Panamanian male singers
20th-century Panamanian singers
Panamanian composers
Panamanian songwriters
Salsa musicians
21st-century Panamanian male singers
21st-century Panamanian singers